The first world record in the men's discus was recognised by the International Association of Athletics Federations in 1912, and was set by James Duncan in 1912 (47.58 m).

As of 2011, 42 world records have been ratified by the IAAF in the event. Another 14 are acknowledged but are unofficial, since they were set before the founding of IAAF.

Outdoor progression

Indoor world record progress

References

Discus throw records IAAF.org

Discus, men
Discus*
Discus throw
World record discus throw